Billardiera fusiformis (Australian bluebell) is a species of plant in the family, Pittosporaceae, which is endemic to Western Australia.

Description
B. fusiformis is a sturdy climber, which flowers from November to February with blue, white or pink flowers. It is found in coastal areas, and disturbed areas.

It is a long-lived climbing plant which is rarely bushy in habit. New stems are greenish in colour and densely hairy, while older stems are reddish brown. The long leaves are almost stalkless, have entire margins and are softly hairy. The nodding blue flowers occur in small clusters at the branch tips. These flowers have five petals and five yellowish stamens which are pressed to each other. The cylindrical fruit are narrowed towards each end, making  the shape of a spindle (fusiform), and are dark green or purplish.

B. fusiformis can be distinguished from B. heterophylla by:
its climbing or twining habit (it is rarely shrubby) and its relatively narrow adult leaves which are entire and almost stalkless. Its flower sepals are all about the same size and the anthers are noticeably longer than their filaments, and its somewhat spindle-shaped (i.e. fusiform) fruit; whereas
B. heterophylla generally has a shrubby habit with some climbing stems, and  relatively broad  adult leaves which are finely toothed and borne on short stalks. Its flower sepals are of different sizes and the anthers are about the same length as their filaments. and the fruit are cylindrical in shape.

Distribution and habitat
In Western Australia, it is found in the IBRA regions: Avon Wheatbelt, Coolgardie, Esperance Plains, Jarrah Forest, Mallee, Swan Coastal Plain, Warren.

Weed status
The species has been cultivated as a garden plant, and has now become  a significant weed in Victoria, South Australia, Tasmania, New South Wales and the ACT. It invades woodlands, forests, shrublands, and grasslands, smothering ground flora and small shrubs, with large numbers of seedlings emerging in already infested areas, following fires.  The seed is also spread by small native mammals (potoroos, quokkas, bush rats) eating the fruits, with the seed becoming more viable after ingestion.

Taxonomy
B. fusiformis was first described by Jacques-Julien Houtou de Labillardière in 1805. Cayzer et al. (2004), being unable to locate the type specimen, designated the lectotype as being the illustration (tab. 90) given in "Novae Hollandiae Plantarum Specimen".

Etymology
The genus name, Billardiera, honours the French botanist Jacques-Julien Houtou de Labillardière who was the first to describe so many Australian plants.
The  specific epithet is derived from the Latin: fusiformis, -e: shaped like a spindle, that is, swollen in the middle and tapering at each end, and refers to the shape of the fruits.

Gallery

References

External links 
 
 Bennett, E.M. 1972. 
 Bennett, E.M. 1978. 

fusiformis
Plants described in 1805
Taxa named by Jacques Labillardière
Endemic flora of Southwest Australia